Aleuritopteris grevilleoides is a species of fern in the family Pteridaceae. It is endemic to China. Its natural habitat is subtropical or tropical moist lowland forests. It is threatened by habitat loss.

References

grevilleoides
Endemic flora of China
Endangered plants
Taxonomy articles created by Polbot